Lodewijk Heyligen (also known as Ludovicus Sanctus de Beeringhen, Lodewijk Heiligen, Ludovicus Sanctus, Heyliger of Beeringhen, Ludwig van Kempen and Louis van Campen) (1304, Beringen, Belgium – 1361, Avignon) was a Flemish Benedictine monk and music theorist who served as the master of music of cardinal Giovanni Colonna in Avignon. There he became one of the closest friends of the Italian poet Petrarch. His Latin name Ludovicus Sanctus (sometimes rendered as Santus) means Louis the Saint and is a literal translation of the Flemish name Lodewijk Heyligen.

Biography
Very little is known about the early life of Lodewijk Heyligen. It is believed he was born in Beringen. Beringen was located in the archdeaconry of Campine (in Dutch: Aartsdiakonaat Kempenland) which in turn was part of the Prince-Bishopric of Liège. This is at the origin of Lodewijk's alternative names of Ludwig van Kempen and Louis van Campen. After studies at the Latin College in Beringen, he studied music at the abbey school of St. Laurent in Liège. After taking holy orders he traveled to the papal court in Avignon where he became linked to Cardinal Giovanni Colonna. He first became a cantor and later secretary to Colonna and was also the master of music at the Chapel of Colonna. He was further appointed cantor of the St. Donatian's Cathedral in Bruges in 1342.

In a letter to the chapter of the St. Donatian's Cathedral dated 27 April 1348 the content of which has been partially preserved, Lodewijk Heyligen describes the horrors of the plague that was then raging in Europe. He ascribes the origin of the plague to calamitous events in India and the arrival in Genoa and later Marseille of merchant ships coming from the Orient. The letter recounts that half of the population of Avignon had died of the disease and that 11,000 of them had been buried in a new cemetery.

After his master Colonna died from the plague in 1348 he remained principally in Avignon where he died in 1361.

Music theorist
He is probably the author of two treatises on music formerly attributed to Louis of Toulouse (1274–1297), De musicae commendacione (which is lost) and the Sentencia in musica sonora subiecti (which still exists). The latter treatise is structured as a scholastic investigation into the essence of music, to which he refers as musica sonora. He concludes that the essence of music is found primarily in the relation between number and sound, secondly in the relation of one sound to another and finally—based on the first two categories—in the determination of properties, emotions and modulations.

Friend of Petrarch
Only in 1904 was it established with certainty on the basis of documents from the Vatican that the person to whom Petrarch in his writings referred as 'Socrates' was in fact Lodewijk Heyligen. Their relationship can be traced back to the year 1330, when Petrarch was visiting Bishop Giacomo Colonna in Lombez. There he became acquainted with Giacomo's brother cardinal Giovanni and his entourage of which Lodewijk Heyligen formed a part. They had the same age and became very close. Petrarch wrote about 20 letters to Lodewijk which have been preserved. Petrarch alludes in his letters to the curious fact that Socrates is the only one of his good friends, who was not given to him by Italy, but instead by the Campine (Kempen). However, the letter continues, Socrates through his temperament, and especially his friendship with Petrarch himself, had almost become Italian himself.

Petrarch refers to Lodewijk Heyligen as a very learned man, who was also distinguished by his musical gifts. Petrarch praises him for his elevated character and his loyal friendship. It is possible that Lodewijk Heyligen inspired in Petrarch the desire to visit the Southern Netherlands (present-day Belgium), a trip that the two friends may have taken together.

In his letters to Lodewijk Heyligen, Petrarch often discloses his inner feelings. None of the letters that Lodewijk Heyligen wrote to Petrarch have been preserved. Yet it was through a letter from Lodewijk Heyligen that Petrarch received the news of the death of his beloved Laura, the muse of Petrarch's poetry. Lodewijk may have been present when she died. In the letter to which Petrarcha refers, Lodewijk assured Petrarch that when Laura died angels took her soul up into heaven.

At Lodewijk's instance Petrarch edited a collection of his letters. Petrarch dedicated the collection entitled Epistolae de rebus familiaribus (Familiar Letters) to his friend referred to as Socrates. The death of Lodewijk Heyligen in 1361 affected Petrarch painfully. A note in his Virgil-codex reveals his sadness upon receiving the news of his death: "Amisi comitem ac solatium meae vitae" (I have lost my comrade and the solace of my life!). Petrarch also called up the memory of his friend in a passage in the Trionfo d'Amore (Triumph of Love, from Triumphs) where he recognizes Socrates and Lelio (the literary nickname of Stefano Romano, a mutual friend of Petrarch and Lodewijk) amid the crowd, which is carried behind the chariot of Cupid:

These words speak convincingly of the intimate friendship that Petrarch felt for Lodewijk.

References

External links
 Ludovicus Sanctus, musicologie.org
 Sur le Socrate de Pétrarque. Le musicien flamand Ludovicus sanctus de Beeringhen, Henry Cochin, in: Mélanges d'archéologie et d'histoire, year 1918, Volume 37, Issue 37, pp. 3–32]
 English translation of the Trionfo d'Amore (Triumph of Love) of Petrarch
 English translation of the Epistolae de rebus familiaribus (Familiar Letters)
 Catharina Ypes, Petrarca in de Nederlandse letterkunde. De Spieghel, Amsterdam 1934
 Full text in Latin of the Sententia in musica sonora subiecti

1304 births
1361 deaths
Flemish Christian monks
Flemish music theorists
People from Beringen, Belgium
Flemish musicians